The Liberation Order Badge is a military badge given during the Vietnam War by North Vietnam.

References 

Military awards and decorations of Vietnam
Vietnam War